HNLMS Scheveningen (M841) is the fourth ship in the City / Vlissingen-class mine countermeasures vessels, and second to be built for the Royal Netherlands Navy.

See also
 Future of the Royal Netherlands Navy

References

Minehunters of the Netherlands